Dometrice "Dee" Clemmons (born in Atlanta, Georgia) is an American politician, entrepreneur, and business coach. She is the first female African-American Commissioner in Henry County, Georgia who represents the 2nd district.

Early life and family
Dee was educated at Spelman College from where she graduated in 1991 with a bachelor's degree. Dee received a Masters in Leadership from Beulah Heights University and her certified coaching credential from Center for Executive Coaching.

Dee is married and the couple have two daughters, including Broadway star and actress, India Scandrick.

Career
After her graduation, Dee taught middle school students until 1993, when she made the decision to change her career focus to public service.  In 1990 while serving as student appointment on the First Board of the White House's Points of Light Foundation, she introduced numerous programs to develop interest in college students of public service. She continued her career as a socialpreneur 

In 2016, Dee was elected to the board of commissioners in Henry County, Georgia as a Democratic Party candidate. As a commissioner, she is best known for shutting down confederate museum, named Nash Farm Battlefield Museum. Other notable works include extension of Henry County airport.

In 2018, she received Commissioner of the Year Award for her work as a commissioner to improve Highway 19/41 corridor and the county-owned Henry County Airport.

In 2020, she was named as the board chair of Shaquille Oneal Henry County Boys and Girls Club.

In 2022, she was successfully reelected as a commissioner of Henry County.

As a businesswoman, she is a franchisee of Painting with a Twist which she opened during the COVID-19 pandemic. She also owns several other businesses in Florida and in Stockbridge, Georgia.

Dee is the author of books such as Influential Leadership, Empower Her, and Boss Addict.

Bibliography
 Influential Leadership
 Empower Her
 Boss Addict

References

Living people
African-American women in politics
Spelman College alumni
Year of birth missing (living people)
People from Henry County, Georgia
Georgia (U.S. state) Democrats
Schoolteachers from Georgia (U.S. state)
County commissioners in Georgia (U.S. state)